The Landai Sin River ( Lanḍai Sīn, "Short River"), also called the Bashgal River, is located in eastern Afghanistan. It rises in the Hindu Kush range near the Mandol Pass in the Nuristan Province of Afghanistan, and is fed from glaciers and snow to its north.

The Landai Sin Valley is inhabited by the Kata, Mumo (Madugal), Kashtan, and Kom tribes of the Nuristani people. Eastern Kata-vari is the main spoken language in the Landai Sin Valley. The main town on the river is Kamdesh.

See also
 List of rivers of Afghanistan

References

External links

Rivers of Afghanistan
Indus basin
Landforms of Nuristan Province
Border rivers